is a former professional Japanese baseball player.

External links

 NPB.com

1982 births
People from Nagareyama
Baseball people from Chiba Prefecture
Hokkaido Nippon-Ham Fighters players
Japanese baseball players
Living people
Nippon Professional Baseball pitchers
Tokyo Yakult Swallows players